Thoboki Mohohlo (born 30 July 1990) is a professional squash player from South Africa. He attended Trinity College in Hartford, Connecticut. Mohohlo reached a career-high world ranking of 131 in May 2016.

External links 
 

1990 births
Living people
South African male squash players
Sportspeople from Johannesburg
21st-century South African people